Holland Gin is an unincorporated community in Limestone County, Alabama, in the United States. Holland Gin was named for a cotton gin operated by a father and son, Hezzie and Egbert Holland.

References

Unincorporated communities in Limestone County, Alabama
Unincorporated communities in Alabama